Civil War: X-Men is a four-issue comic book mini-series, published in 2006 by Marvel Comics. The series was written by David Hine, Fabian Nicieza, Peter David, and Dennis Calero. The illustration of the mini-series was done by Staz Johnson and Dennis Calero. Though published as part of the wider Civil War event, its plot is a continuation of the earlier X-Men: The 198 mini-series.

Plot
Prior to the publication of Civil War: X-Men, the events of House of M reduced the mutant population to only 198 known mutants, and the US government has turned the Xavier Institute into a relocation camp patrolled by Sentinel Squad O*N*E*. In Civil War #3, the X-Men declare official neutrality in the superhero civil war.

In X-Men: Civil War #1, X-Force members Domino, Shatterstar and Caliban break the 198 out of the Xavier Institute. Cyclops declines to assist the O*N*E, but Bishop wants mutants to police their own. Bishop is given permission by the government to take Sabra and Micromax to find the escapees. The surviving original X-Men decide to sneak off the grounds to find the escapees before Bishop can arrest them.

In issue #2, General Lazer, head of the O*N*E, discovers Johnny Dee's power to control anyone whose DNA he can digest. Cyclops contacts Captain America, who reveals the Nevada bunker Domino has taken the escaped mutants to. Bishop learns that the President of the United States is considering full amnesty for the 198 and just as Cyclops' team is about to enter the bunker, Bishop and several Sentinels arrive and tell everyone to await the President's decision. Just then, Lazer has Johnny Dee force Cyclops into releasing the full power of his optic blasts on Bishop, but Bishop redirects the energy upwards towards the sky.

In issue #3, Val Cooper stumbles onto Lazer and Johnny Dee's machinations, and she becomes head of the O*N*E and calls a cease fire. However, Lazer has already initiated a self-destruct sequence in the bunker the 198 are in.

In issue #4, the X-Men team up with Bishop, Iron Man, and Ms. Marvel to save the 198 from the exploding bunker. Johnny Dee kills Lazer while Val Cooper is interrogating him and Johnny Dee is locked away in prison. The 198 walk away intact and separate while Bishop leaves the X-Men. He is later seen talking to Val who tells him the O*N*E were given too much discretionary power at the expense of mutant civil rights and that the President has appointed an oversight committee to make changes. The first being that the Xavier Institute becomes a community for mutants, with residency being voluntary and open to all who wish to reside there, and that the O*N*E would no longer be authorized to restrict their comings and goings. The second change is that the Sentinels would remain on the grounds, but for protection only and that mutants would be free to come and go as they pleased. Val then offers Bishop a job with the O*N*E, which he accepts.

Collected editions

Trade paperbacks

2006 comics debuts